The Wonder Years is the debut studio album by South Korean girl group Wonder Girls. It was released on September 13, 2007, by JYP Entertainment. It produced Two singles, "Tell Me" and "This Fool". This album is including song from the debut single album, The Wonder Begins which is "Irony", "Bad Boy" and "It's Not Love". Also, a music video for a soul track "Wishing on a Star" was released, however it wasn't released as a single. "Tell Me" topped various musical charts. Although member Hyuna left two months before the album was released and was replaced by Yubin, all tracks on the album featured Hyuna's vocals. Only the rap version of "Tell Me" features Yubin's raps. Also, Yubin sings on the track "Wishing on a Star". The Wonder Years was a sequel to Wonder Girls' single album, The Wonder Begins (2007) and a prequel to Wonder Girls' first extended play The Wonder Years: Trilogy (2008). On April 23, 2012, album was re-released through recording label KMP Holdings.

Background 
Wonder Girls were formed in 2006 by Park Jin-young during the television reality show MTV Wonder Girls (2006–2010), during which they held their first performances, rehearsals and recording sessions. At first a quartet, the fifth member Park Ye-eun, also known as Yenny, joined the group and the group released their successful debut single "Irony" in February 2007. The same month, their debut single album The Wonder Begins was released and was followed with two more singles "Bad Boy" and "It's Not Love". Later was used as the soundtrack for film Hellcats, in which member Sohee starred. In July 2007, group's rapper Hyuna left the group due to health problems and was on hiatus until she joined another South Korean girl group 4minute. She was replaced by rapper Yubin who was originally a member of girl group Five Girls but joined JYP Entertainment when the group subsequently went inactive. 

Their single "Tell Me" was released in September 2007 and became one of their biggest hits. The remix, titled "Tell Me (Rap Version)" was made to include Yubin's vocals and was included on their 2008 single album So Hot. The album was recorded in Seoul from December 2006 (when MTV Wonder Girls first aired) until 2007. The title of the album is The Wonder Years, however on album cover and Discogs it's titled The Wonder Years (The First Album) while on HanBooks it's titled The Wonder Years (1st Album). Also, album cover features a colorful background behind all five members (Yeeun, Yubin, Sohee, Sunye and Sunmi), who are jumping.

Release and promotion 
The Wonder Years was physically released in South Korea through JYP Entertainment and LOEN Entertainment on September 13, 2007. The same day, album was released for digital download worldwide and on US iTunes Store through JYP Entertainment. It was also physically released in Thailand through recording label G"MM' Grammy. Almost five years later, album was re-released on April 23, 2012 through label KMP Holdings. Album was promoted with Two singles: "Tell Me" and "This Fool. During the promotion, member Hyuna left the group. However, album includes her vocals although it was released two months after her departure. Also, album was promoted with an EP The Wonder Begins in February 2007 and various live performances, including the guest-performance at the 2007 spring festival of the Hanyang University and many others. Later, Wonder Girls embarked on their first Asian tour in 2009 before their world tour following year.

Singles 
"Tell Me" was released as the main single from the album and became the group's first number one hit.  Due to the last-minute addition of rapper Kim Yubin to the group, her rap is not on the album version. The version including her rap was included as a B-side on the group's maxi-single So Hot (2008).

The second single from the album was "This Fool (이 바보)", which debuted on MBC's show Music Core on December 10, 2007. This song was used to promote the South Korean film Hellcats which features Wonder Girls member Ahn Sohee.

Track listing 
All lyrics and music are written and composed by Park Jin-young, unless otherwise noted.

Notes
 "Tell Me" samples the song "Two of Hearts" by Stacey Q.

Personnel

Min Sunye – vocals (all tracks)
Park Ye-eun – vocals (all tracks)
Ahn Sohee – vocals (all tracks)
Lee Sunmi – vocals (all tracks)
Kim Yubin – vocals (tracks 1-10)
Kim Hyuna – vocals (11,12,13), background vocals (tracks 2, 3, 4, 6, 8, 9, 12, 13)
Park Jin-young – songwriting, production (tracks 1, 2, 3, 9, 10, 11, 12, 13), background vocals (track 3)
Woo Seok Rhee – production (tracks 1, 3)
Won Hyeon Jeong – background vocals (tracks 2, 13)
Mitchell John Dixon – songwriting, production (track 3)

Tae Kwon – songwriting, production (tracks 4, 5, 9, 12)
Seo Ui Beom – songwriting, production (track 4)
Jang Jun Ho – production (track 5)
Brian Kim – featured artist, songwriting, production (track 6)
Bag Chae Won – songwriting (track 7)
Lyu Hyeong Seob – production (track 7)
Lin Jeong Yeon – background vocals (track 7)
Lee Min Woo – featured artist, songwriting, production (track 8)
Bang Si-hyuk – production (track 11)

Charts

Monthly charts

Yearly charts

Release history

References 

Wonder Girls albums
JYP Entertainment albums
KMP Holdings albums
Kakao M albums
2007 debut albums
Korean-language albums
Albums produced by Park Jin-young
Dance-pop albums by South Korean artists
Synth-pop albums by South Korean artists
Contemporary R&B albums by South Korean artists
Electropop albums